Renāte Fedotova (born 12 December 1996) is a Latvian football striker, who is currently playing for Pink Bari CF.

International goals

Honours 
Rīgas FS
Winner
 Latvian Women's League: 2014

References

External links 
 

1996 births
Living people
Latvian women's footballers
Women's association football forwards
Rīgas FS players
FK Liepājas Metalurgs (women) players
Latvia women's youth international footballers
Latvia women's international footballers